The !!!! Beat is an American television program that aired in syndication for 26 episodes in 1966. It was hosted by the Nashville, Tennessee based disc jockey Bill "Hoss" Allen, and featured a house band led by Clarence "Gatemouth" Brown. The show was recorded in color at WFAA, the ABC affiliate in Dallas, which had color facilities, and recorded and syndicated episodes of the program. At that time, none of the Nashville stations had color capability.

Guests included: Otis Redding, Little Milton, Esther Phillips, Joe Tex, Etta James, Lattimore Brown, Roscoe Shelton, Carla Thomas, Freddie King, Barbara Lynn, Johnny Taylor, The Radiants, Louis Jordan, The Mighty Hannibal, Clarence 'Frogman' Henry, Robert Parker, Joe Simon, Mitty Collier, Jamo Thomas, Z. Z. Hill, Lou Rawls, Bobby Hebb, Willie Mitchell, Don Bryant, The Ovations, The Bar-Kays, Percy Sledge, Garnet Mimms, and Sam & Dave all appeared. Some of the artists would also chart well into the 1970s.

DVD release
In 2005, Bear Family Records released all 26 episodes of the show (on six discs) on Region 1 DVD in the United States.

References

1966 American television series debuts
1966 American television series endings
1960s American music television series
English-language television shows
First-run syndicated television programs in the United States
Television shows filmed in Texas